Luka Milivojević (born 7 April 1991) is a Serbian professional footballer who plays as a midfielder and captains  club Crystal Palace. He was a member of the Serbian national team until his retirement from international football in March 2021.

He began his career with Radnički Kragujevac and then played for Rad before signing for Red Star Belgrade in January 2012. He later won the Belgian Pro League with Anderlecht and Superleague Greece twice with Olympiacos before a €16 million transfer to Crystal Palace in January 2017. Milivojević made his international debut for Serbia in 2012 and was included in the squad for the 2018 FIFA World Cup.

Club career

Early years
Milivojević's first season as senior was with his home town club Radnički Kragujevac during the 2007–08 season, then playing in the Serbian League West. At the end of that season he moved to the top league club Rad entered into the senior team in the 2008–09 season. He played as right side midfielder.

Red Star Belgrade
Milivojević signed for Red Star Belgrade on 19 December 2011. His arrival to Red Star was largely due to the desire of coach Robert Prosinečki, who believed that Milivojević had bright potential. On 17 November 2012, Milivojević scored an impressive goal against city rivals Partizan.

Anderlecht
On 26 July 2013, Milivojević signed a five-year contract with Belgian football giants Anderlecht. On 1 September 2014, it was announced that Milivojević had joined Olympiacos on loan from Anderlecht.

After the 2014–15 season, Milivojević reiterated his desire to stay with Olympiacos. The two clubs could have started new negotiations after the season ended; Milivojević stated that his wish was to make the move permanent. According to reports in Belgium, Olympiacos were to meet Anderlecht's asking price in order to complete the permanent transfer of Milivojević. Olympiacos were in negotiations with the Belgian club as they were reluctant to pay the €2.7 million Anderlecht asked for Milivojević.

Olympiacos
On 4 June 2015, Anderlecht confirmed that it had reached an agreement with Olympiacos for the permanent transfer of Milivojević. He had spent a season with the club, and joined the Greek champions by signing a four-year contract, for a fee of €2.3 million. On 30 June 2015, Olympiacos turned down a bid in the region of €5 million from Fenerbahçe.

Crystal Palace

On 31 January 2017, Milivojević signed for Crystal Palace on a three-and-a-half year contract for an undisclosed fee. On 10 April 2017, he scored his first goal for Palace with a penalty kick in his team's 3–0 home win over Arsenal, and got his other goal of the season on 14 May in a 4–0 win at Selhurst Park against Hull City, which secured his team's place in the top flight for next season and relegated the opponents.

In 2017–18, Milivojević was Palace's top scorer with 10 goals as the Eagles recovered from a poor start to the season to finish 11th under new manager Roy Hodgson. He developed a reputation for taking penalties, scoring nine of the ten he took in his first 1 seasons with Palace; he had never taken a penalty in a professional match prior to joining Crystal Palace. The one he did miss was on 31 December 2017 in added time at the end of a goalless draw against Manchester City, with Ederson making a save for the team who had won their last 18 matches.

On 28 October 2018, Milivojević scored two penalties in a 2–2 home draw with Arsenal, ending the visitors' run of 12 consecutive victories. Away to Manchester City on 22 December, he scored the winning goal from the penalty spot in a 3–2 victory over the title holders.

In August 2019, Milivojević signed a contract extension with Crystal Palace keeping him at the club until 2023.

International career
He was a member of the Serbia u21 team. He was called-up in the Serbia national team on 29 September 2011, to face Italy and Slovenia in the UEFA Euro 2012 qualifying phase.<ref>[http://www.sportske.net/vest/domaci-fudbal/milivojevic-hvala-jankovicu-bicu-jos-bolji-52438.html Milivojević: "Hvala Jankoviću, biću još bolji]  at Sportske.net</ref> He made his debut for Serbia on 14 November 2012 for a friendly match with Chile. On 6 October 2017 he scored his first goal for Serbia in a World Cup Qualifying match with Austria.

In June 2018, he was included in the final 23-man squad for the 2018 FIFA World Cup. There he appeared in two matches, against Costa Rica and Switzerland.

In March 2021, he retired from international duty at the age of 29.

Career statistics
Club

InternationalScores and results list Serbia's goal tally first, score column indicates score after each Milivojević goal''.

Honours

Club
Red Star Belgrade
Serbian Cup: 2011–12
Anderlecht
Belgian Pro League: 2013–14
Belgian Super Cup: 2014
Olympiacos
Superleague Greece: 2014–15, 2015–16
Greek Football Cup: 2014–15

Individual
Serbian SuperLiga Team of the Season: 2011–12, 2012–13

References

External links

Profile at the Crystal Palace F.C. website

1991 births
Living people
Sportspeople from Kragujevac
Serbian footballers
Association football midfielders
Serbia international footballers
Serbia under-21 international footballers
Serbian expatriate footballers
FK Radnički 1923 players
FK Rad players
Red Star Belgrade footballers
Serbian SuperLiga players
R.S.C. Anderlecht players
Belgian Pro League players
Olympiacos F.C. players
Super League Greece players
Crystal Palace F.C. players
Premier League players
Expatriate footballers in Belgium
Expatriate footballers in Greece
Expatriate footballers in England
Serbian expatriate sportspeople in Belgium
Serbian expatriate sportspeople in Greece
Serbian expatriate sportspeople in England
2018 FIFA World Cup players